Stephen Barker may refer to:

 Stephen Barker (politician) (1846–1924), English-born Australian politician
 Stephen F. Barker (1927–2019), American philosopher of mathematics
 Stephen Barker, surveyor who built the Stephen Barker House, Methuen, Massachusetts